The Buena Vista Formation is a Late Permian/Early Triassic geologic formation of the Cerro Largo Department in northeastern Uruguay. The fluvial sandstones and mudstones preserve temnospondyl and archosaur fossils.

Description 
The Buena Vista Formation is characterized by reddish fine sandstone interbedded with lenticular clay layers and intraformational conglomerates deposited in a fluvial environment.

Fossil content 
The following fossils have been reported from the formation:
 Temnospondyls
 Arachana nigra
 Uruyiella liminea
 Dvinosauria indet.
 Mastodonsauridae indet.

 Reptiles
 Pintosaurus magnidentis
 Archosauromorpha indet.

See also 
 List of fossiliferous stratigraphic units in Uruguay

References

Bibliography 
 

Geologic formations of Uruguay
Triassic System of South America
Triassic Uruguay
Sandstone formations
Mudstone formations
Conglomerate formations
Fluvial deposits
Formations
Fossiliferous stratigraphic units of South America
Paleontology in Uruguay
Formations